Lockport Heights is an unincorporated community and census-designated place in Lafourche Parish, Louisiana, United States. Its population was 1,286 as of the 2010 census. Louisiana Highway 1 passes through the community.

Geography

Demographics

Education
It is within Lafourche Parish Public Schools. Zoned schools include:
 Lockport Lower Elementary School in Lockport
 Lockport Upper Elementary School in Lockport
 Lockport Middle School in Lockport
 Central Lafourche High School in Mathews

References

Unincorporated communities in Lafourche Parish, Louisiana
Unincorporated communities in Louisiana
Census-designated places in Lafourche Parish, Louisiana
Census-designated places in Louisiana